Bostanterak Township is a township of Wuqia County in Xinjiang Uygur Autonomous Region, China. Located in the south of the county, the township covers an area of 2,902 square kilometers with a population of 9,725 (as of 2017). It has 6 administrative villages under its jurisdiction. Its seat is at Qorbo Village . Bostanterak is located 135 kilometers away south of the county seat Wuqia Town and 56 kilometers away west of Kashi City. It is bordered by Boritokay Township to the west, Shufu County to the north and northwest, Akto County to the south.

History
"The name "Bostanterak" is from Kyrgyz language, it means "poplar oasis".

Bostanterak was the 1st township of the 3rd district	 in Wuqia County in 1950 and Bostanterak Commune   was formed in 1958, it was renamed Yongzhong Commune  in 1968 and restored the original name in 1980, and organized as a township in 1984.

Settlements
The township has 6 administration villages and 11 unincorporated villages under its jurisdiction.

6 administration villages:
 Qorbo Village
 Ymayk Village
 Qulukbax Village
 Kayldeng Village
 Doratblak Village
 Marajanikum Village

References 

Township-level divisions of Wuqia County